Asia Euro University (Sakâlvĭtyéalai Asi Oerŏb) is a private university located in Phnom Penh, Cambodia. It was established in 2005 under sub-decree No. 05អនក្របក dated January 19, 2005.

References

External links
 Official website

Universities in Cambodia